A penumbral lunar eclipse will take place on September 29, 2042. Earlier sources compute this as a 0.3% partial eclipse lasting under 12 minutes, but newer calculations list it as a penumbral eclipse that never enters the umbral shadow.

Visibility

Related lunar eclipses

Lunar year series

Tzolkinex 
 Preceded: Lunar eclipse of August 19, 2035

 Followed: Lunar eclipse of November 9, 2049

See also
List of lunar eclipses and List of 21st-century lunar eclipses

References

External links

2042-09
2042-09
2042 in science